"Honey Love" a song by American R&B singer R. Kelly and American R&B group Public Announcement. It was released as the second single from Kelly's debut studio album Born into the 90's (1992). It became Kelly's first number-one on the US R&B chart where it peaked for two weeks; also it barely made the Top 40 pop chart portion, peaking at number 39 on the Billboard Hot 100.

The song was also used in the 1993 movie Menace II Society.

Music video
The video features a cameo appearance by actress Halle Berry.

Legacy
During the tour in support of Born into the 90's, Kelly came up with the concept for his album 12 Play. In the breakdown of "Honey Love", he addressed the audience and told them about "a dream where I made love to Mary J. Blige", which became the song "12 Play".

R. Kelly mentions "Honey Love" in a verse of "I Wish": "'Honey Love' goes platinum and y'all ass come around / But y'all don't wanna raise the roof until my shit is going down."

Charts

Weekly charts

Year-end charts

See also
List of number-one R&B singles of 1992 (U.S.)

References

External links
 "Honey Love" Music Video

R. Kelly songs
Songs written by R. Kelly
1992 singles
Contemporary R&B ballads
1992 songs
Jive Records singles
1990s ballads